George Leverett White (March 10, 1858 – April 25, 1917) was a Canadian politician. He served in the Legislative Assembly of New Brunswick as a member from Carleton County.

References 

1858 births
1917 deaths